Estádio Hailé Pinheiro, better known as Estádio da Serrinha, is a multi-use stadium located in Goiânia, Brazil. It is used mostly for football matches and hosts the home matches of Goiás Esporte Clube. The stadium has currently a maximum capacity of 14,450 people.

History
The stadium had originally a capacity for 6,403 people.

Estádio da Serrinha was one of the venues of the 2019 FIFA U-17 World Cup.

Expansion
In February 2019 Goiás started expanding the stadium with the construction of a new terrace behind one of the goalposts, raising the capacity to 12,500 people. In February 2020 was started another phase of the expansion with the construction of a new sideline terrace scheduled to be finished in May 2020, with this expansion the capacity raised to 14,000 people, Goiás planned to start using the stadium for Campeonato Brasileiro Série A matches.

References

External links
Templos do Futebol

Serrinha
Sports venues in Goiás